A train (from Old French , from Latin , "to pull, to draw") is a series of connected vehicles that run along a railway track and transport people or freight. Trains are typically pulled or pushed by locomotives (often known simply as "engines"), though some are self-propelled, such as multiple units. Passengers and cargo are carried in railroad cars, also known as wagons. Trains are designed to a certain gauge, or distance between rails. Most trains operate on steel tracks with steel wheels, the low friction of which makes them more efficient than other forms of transport.

Trains have their roots in wagonways, which used railway tracks and were powered by horses or pulled by cables. Following the invention of the steam locomotive in the United Kingdom in 1804, trains rapidly spread around the world, allowing freight and passengers to move over land faster and cheaper than ever possible before. Rapid transit and trams were first built in the late 1800s to transport large numbers of people in and around cities. Beginning in the 1920s, and accelerating following World War II, diesel and electric locomotives replaced steam as the means of motive power. Following the development of cars, trucks, and extensive networks of highways which offered greater mobility, as well as faster airplanes, trains declined in importance and market share, and many rail lines were abandoned. The spread of buses led to the closure of many rapid transit and tram systems during this time as well.

Since the 1970s, governments, environmentalists, and train advocates have promoted increased use of trains due to their greater fuel efficiency and lower greenhouse gas emissions compared to other modes of land transport. High-speed rail, first built in the 1960s, has proven competitive with cars and planes over short to medium distances. Commuter rail has grown in importance since the 1970s as an alternative to congested highways and a means to promote development, as has light rail in the 21st century. Freight trains remain important for the transport of bulk commodities such as coal and grain, as well as being a means of reducing road traffic congestion by freight trucks.

While conventional trains operate on relatively flat tracks with two rails, a number of specialized trains exist which are significantly different in their mode of operation. Monorails operate on a single rail, while funiculars and rack railways are uniquely designed to traverse steep slopes. Experimental trains such as high speed maglevs, which use magnetic levitation to float above a guideway, are under development in the 2020s and offer higher speeds than even the fastest conventional trains. Development of trains which use alternative fuels such as natural gas and hydrogen is another 21st century development.

History

Early history 

Trains are an evolution of wheeled wagons running on stone wagonways, the earliest of which were built by Babylon circa 2,200 BCE. Starting in the 1500s, wagonways were introduced to haul material from mines; from the 1790s, stronger iron rails were introduced. Following early developments in the second half of the 1700s, in 1804 a steam locomotive built by British inventor Richard Trevithick powered the first ever steam train. Outside of coal mines, where fuel was readily available, steam locomotives remained untried until the opening of the Stockton and Darlington Railway in 1825. The success of this locomotive, and Stephenson's Rocket in 1829, convinced many of the value in steam locomotives, and within a decade the stock market bubble known as "Railway Mania" started across the United Kingdom.

News of the success of steam locomotives quickly reached the United States, where the first steam railroad opened in 1829. American railroad pioneers soon started manufacturing their own locomotives, designed to handle the sharper curves and rougher track typical of the country's railroads.The other nations of Europe also took note of British railroad developments, and most countries on the continent constructed and opened their first railroads in the 1830s and 1840s, following the first run of a steam train in France in late 1829. In the 1850s, trains continued to expand across Europe, with many influenced by or purchases of American locomotive designs. Other European countries pursued their own distinct designs. Around the world, steam locomotives grew larger and more powerful throughout the rest of the century as technology advanced.

Trains first entered service in South America, Africa, and Asia through construction by imperial powers, which starting in the 1840s built railroads to solidify control of their colonies and transport cargo for export. In Japan, which was never colonized, railroads first arrived in the early 1870s. By 1900, railroads were operating on every continent besides uninhabited Antarctica.

New technologies 
Even as steam locomotive technology continued to improve, inventors in Germany started work on alternative methods for powering trains. Werner von Siemens built the first train powered by electricity in 1879, and went on to pioneer electric trams. Another German inventor, Rudolf Diesel, constructed the first diesel engine in the 1890s, though the potential of his invention to power trains was not realized until decades later. Between 1897 and 1903, tests of experimental electric locomotives on the Royal Prussian Military Railway in Germany demonstrated they were viable, setting speed records in excess of .Early gas powered "doodlebug" self-propelled railcars entered service on railroads in the first decade of the 1900s. Experimentation with diesel and gas power continued, culminating in the German "Flying Hamburger" in 1933, and the influential American EMD FT in 1939. These successful diesel locomotives showed that diesel power was superior to steam, due to lower costs, ease of maintenance, and better reliability. Meanwhile, Italy developed an extensive network of electric trains during the first decades of the 20th century, driven by that country's lack of significant coal reserves.

Dieselization and increased competition 
World War II brought great destruction to existing railroads across Europe, Asia, and Africa. Following the war's conclusion in 1945, nations which had suffered extensive damage to their railroad networks took the opportunity provided by Marshall Plan funds (or economic assistance from the USSR and Comecon, for nations behind the Iron Curtain) and advances in technology to convert their trains to diesel or electric power. France, Russia, Switzerland, and Japan were leaders in adopting widespread electrified railroads, while other nations focused primarily on dieselization. By 1980, the majority of the world's steam locomotives had been retired, though they continued to be used in parts of Africa and Asia, along with a few holdouts in Europe and South America. China was the last country to fully dieselize, due to its abundant coal reserves; steam locomotives were used to haul mainline trains as late as 2005 in Inner Mongolia.

Trains began to face strong competition from automobiles and freight trucks in the 1930s, which greatly intensified following World War II. After the war, air transport also became a significant competitor for passenger trains. Large amounts of traffic shifted to these new forms of transportation, resulting in a widespread decline in train service, both freight and passenger. The first high-speed rail service was the Japanese Shinkansen, which entered service in 1964. In the following decades, high speed rail networks were developed across much of Europe and Eastern Asia, providing fast and reliable service competitive with automobiles and airplanes. The first high-speed train in the Americas was Amtrak's Acela in the United States, which entered service in 2000.

To the present day 
Towards the end of the 20th century, increased awareness of the benefits of trains for transport led to a revival in their use and importance. Freight trains are significantly more efficient than trucks, while also emitting far fewer greenhouse gas emissions per ton-mile; passenger trains are also far more energy efficient than other modes of transport. According to the International Energy Agency, "On average, rail requires 12 times less energy and emits 7-11 times less GHGs per passenger-km travelled than private vehicles and airplanes, making it the most efficient mode of motorised passenger transport. Aside from shipping, freight rail is the most energy-efficient and least carbon-intensive way to transport goods." As such, rail transport is considered an important part of achieving sustainable energy. Intermodal freight trains, carrying double-stack shipping containers, have since the 1970s generated significant business for railroads and gained market share from trucks. Increased use of commuter rail has also been promoted as a means of fighting traffic congestion on highways in urban areas.

Types and terminology 

Trains can be sorted into types based on whether they haul passengers or freight (though mixed trains which haul both exist), by their weight (heavy rail for regular trains, light rail for lighter rapid transit systems), by their speed, and by what form of track they use. Conventional trains operate on two rails, but several other types of track systems are also in use around the world.

Terminology 
The railway terminology that is used to describe a train varies between countries. The two primary systems of terminology are International Union of Railways terms in much of the world, and Association of American Railroads terms in North America.

Trains are typically defined as one or more locomotives coupled together, with or without cars. A collection of passenger or freight carriages connected together (not necessarily with a locomotive) is (especially in British and Indian English) typically referred to as a rake. A collection of rail vehicles may also be called a consist. A set of vehicles that are permanently or semi-permanently coupled together (such as the Pioneer Zephyr) is called a trainset. The term rolling stock is used to describe any kind of train vehicle.

Components

Bogies 

Bogies, also known in North America as trucks, support the wheels and axles of trains. Trucks range from just one axle to as many as four or more. Two-axle trucks are in the widest use worldwide, as they are better able to handle curves and support heavy loads than single axle trucks.

Couplers 

Train vehicles are linked to one another by various systems of coupling. In much of Europe, India, and South America, trains primarily use buffers and chain couplers, while in the rest of the world knuckle couplers are used.

Brakes 

Because trains are heavy, powerful brakes are needed to slow or stop trains, and because steel wheels on steel rails have relatively low friction, brakes must be distributed among as many wheels as possible. Early trains could only be stopped by manually applied hand brakes, requiring workers to ride on top of the cars and apply the brakes when the train went downhill. Hand brakes are still used to park cars and locomotives, but the predominant braking system for trains globally is air brakes, invented in 1869 by George Westinghouse. Air brakes are applied at once to the entire train using air hoses.

Warning devices 

For safety and communication, trains are equipped with bells, horns, and lights. Steam locomotives typically use steam whistles rather than horns. Other types of lights may be installed on locomotives and cars, such as classification lights, Mars Lights, and ditch lights.

Cabs 
Locomotives are in most cases equipped with cabs, also known as driving compartments, where a train driver controls the train's operation. They may also be installed on unpowered train cars known as cab or control cars, to allow for a train to operate with the locomotive at the rear.

Operations

Scheduling and dispatching 
To prevent collisions or other accidents, trains are often scheduled, and almost always are under the control of train dispatchers. Historically, trains operated based on timetables; most passenger trains continue to operate based on fixed schedules, though freight trains may instead run on an as-needed basis, or when enough freight cars are available to justify running a train.

Maintenance 

Simple repairs may be done while a train is parked on the tracks, but more extensive repairs will be done at a motive power depot. Similar facilities exist for repairing damaged or defective train cars. Maintenance of way trains are used to build and repair railroad tracks and other equipment.

Crew 
Train drivers, also known as engineers, are responsible for operating trains. Conductors are in charge of trains and their cargo, and help passengers on passenger trains. Brakeman, also known as trainmen, were historically responsible for manually applying brakes, though the term is used today to refer to crew members who perform tasks such as operating switches, coupling and uncoupling train cars, and setting handbrakes on equipment. Steam locomotives require a fireman who is responsible for fueling and regulating the locomotive's fire and boiler. On passenger trains, other crew members assist passengers, such as chefs to prepare food, and service attendants to provide food and drinks to passengers. Other passenger train specific duties include passenger car attendants, who assist passengers with boarding and alighting from trains, answer questions, and keep train cars clean, and sleeping car attendants, who perform similar duties in sleeping cars.

Gauge 

Around the world, various track gauges are in use for trains. In most cases, trains can only operate on tracks that are of the same gauge; where different gauge trains meet, it is known as a break of gauge. Trains also need to fit within the loading gauge profile to avoid fouling bridges and lineside infrastructure with this being a potential limiting factor on loads such as intermodal container types that may be carried.

Safety 

Train accidents sometimes occur, including derailments (when a train leaves the tracks) and train wrecks (collisions between trains). Accidents were more common in the early days of trains, when railway signal systems, centralized traffic control, and failsafe systems to prevent collisions were primitive or did not yet exist. To prevent accidents, systems such as automatic train stop are used; these are failsafe systems that apply the brakes on a train if it passes a red signal and enters an occupied block, or if any of the train's equipment malfunctions. More advanced safety systems, such as positive train control, can also automatically regulate train speed, preventing derailments from entering curves or switches too fast.

Modern trains have a very good safety record overall, comparable with air travel. In the United States between 2000 and 2009, train travel averaged 0.43 deaths per billion passenger miles traveled. While this was higher than that of air travel at 0.07 deaths per billion passenger miles, it was also far below the 7.28 deaths per billion passenger miles of car travel. In the 21st century, several derailments of oil trains caused fatalities, most notably the Canadian Lac-Mégantic rail disaster in 2013 which killed 47 people and leveled much of the town of Lac-Mégantic.

The vast majority of train-related fatalities, over 90 percent, are due to trespassing on railroad tracks, or collisions with road vehicles at level crossings. Organizations such as Operation Lifesaver have been formed to improve safety awareness at railroad crossings, and governments have also launched ad campaigns. Trains cannot stop quickly when at speed; even an emergency brake application may still require more than a mile of stopping distance. As such, emphasis is on educating motorists to yield to trains at crossings and avoid trespassing.

Motive power

Before steam 
The first trains were rope-hauled, gravity powered or pulled by horses.

Steam 
Steam locomotives work by using a boiler to heat water into steam, which powers the locomotive's pistons which are in turn connected to the wheels. In the mid 20th century, most steam locomotives were replaced by diesel or electric locomotives, which were cheaper, cleaner, and more reliable. Steam locomotives are still used in heritage railways operated in many countries for the leisure and enthusiast market.

Diesel 
Diesel locomotives are powered with a diesel engine, which generates electricity to drive traction motors. This is known as a diesel–electric transmission, and is used on almost all diesels. Diesel power replaced steam for a variety of reasons: diesel locomotives were less complex, far more reliable, cheaper, cleaner, easier to maintain, and more fuel efficient.

Electric 
Electric trains receive their current via overhead lines or through a third rail electric system, which is then used to power traction motors that drive the wheels. Electric traction offers a lower cost per mile of train operation but at a higher initial cost, which can only be justified on high traffic lines. Even though the cost per mile of construction is much higher, electric traction is cheaper to operate thanks to lower maintenance and purchase costs for locomotives and equipment. Compared to diesel locomotives, electric locomotives produce no direct emissions and accelerate much faster, making them better suited to passenger service, especially underground.

Other types 

Various other types of train propulsion have been tried, some more successful than others.

In the mid 1900s, gas turbine locomotives were developed and successfully used, though most were retired due to high fuel costs and poor reliability.

In the 21st century, alternative fuels for locomotives are under development, due to increasing costs for diesel and a desire to reduce greenhouse gas emissions from trains. Examples include hydrail (trains powered by hydrogen fuel cells) and the use of compressed or liquefied natural gas.

Train cars 

Train cars, also known as wagons, are unpowered rail vehicles which are typically pulled by locomotives. Many different types exist, specialized to handle various types of cargo. Some common types include boxcars (also known as covered goods wagons) that carry a wide variety of cargo, flatcars (also known as flat wagons) which have flat tops to hold cargo, hopper cars which carry bulk commodities, and tank cars which carry liquids and gases. Examples of more specialized types of train cars include bottle cars which hold molten steel, Schnabel cars which handle very heavy loads, and refrigerator cars which carry perishable goods.

Early train cars were small and light, much like early locomotives, but over time they have become larger as locomotives have become more powerful.

Passenger trains 

A passenger train is used to transport people along a railroad line. These trains may consist of unpowered passenger railroad cars (also known as coaches or carriages) hauled by one or more locomotives, or may be self-propelled; self propelled passenger trains are known as multiple units or railcars. Passenger trains travel between stations or depots, where passengers may board and disembark. In most cases, passenger trains operate on a fixed schedule and have priority over freight trains.

Passenger trains can be divided into short and long distance services.

Long distance trains 

Long distance passenger trains travel over hundreds or even thousands of miles between cities. In general, long distance trains may take days to complete their journeys, and stop at dozens of stations along their routes. For many rural communities, they are the only form of public transportation available.

Short distance trains 
Short distance or regional passenger trains have travel times measured in hours or even minutes, as opposed to days. They run more frequently than long distance trains, and are often used by commuters. Short distance passenger trains specifically designed for commuters are known as commuter rail.

High speed trains 

High speed trains are designed to be much faster than conventional trains, and typically run on their own separate tracks than other, slower trains. The first high speed train was the Japanese Shinkansen, which opened in 1964. In the 21st century, services such as the French TGV and German Intercity Express are competitive with airplanes in travel time over short to medium distances.

A subset of high speed trains are higher speed trains, which bridge the gap between conventional and high speed trains, and travel at speeds between the two. Examples include the Northeast Regional in the United States, the Gatimaan Express in India, and the KTM ETS in Malaysia.

Rapid transit trains 
A number of types of trains are used to provide rapid transit to urban areas. These are distinct from traditional passenger trains in that they operate more frequently, typically do not share tracks with freight trains, and cover relatively short distances. Many different kinds of systems are in use globally.

Rapid transit trains that operate in tunnels below ground are known as subways, undergrounds, or metros. Elevated railways operate on viaducts or bridges above the ground, often on top of city streets. "Metro" may also refer to rapid transit that operates at ground level. In many systems, two or even all three of these types may exist on different portions of a network.

Trams 

Trams, also known in North America as streetcars, typically operate on or parallel to streets in cities, with frequent stops and a high frequency of service.

Light rail 

Light rail is a catchall term for a variety of systems, which may include characteristics of trams, passenger trains, and rapid transit systems.

Specialized trains 
There are a number of specialized trains which differ from the traditional definition of a train as a set of vehicles which travels on two rails.

Monorail 

Monorails were developed to meet medium-demand traffic in urban transit, and consist of a train running on a single rail, typically elevated. Monorails represent a small proportion of the train systems in use worldwide. Almost all monorail trains use linear induction motors.

Maglev 

The technology uses magnets to levitate the train above the track, reducing friction and allowing higher speeds. The first commercial maglev train was an airport shuttle introduced in 1984 at Birmingham Airport in England.

Maglev has not yet been used for inter-city mass transit routes, with only a few examples in use worldwide as of 2021.

Mine trains 

Mine trains are operated in large mines and carry both workers and goods. They are usually powered by electricity, to prevent emissions which would pose a health risk to workers underground.

Militarized trains 

While they have long been important in transporting troops and military equipment, trains have occasionally been used for direct combat. Armored trains have been used in a number of conflicts, as have railroad based artillery systems. Railcar-launched ICBM systems have also been used by nuclear weapon states.

Rack railway 

For climbing steep slopes, specialized rack railroads are used. In order to avoid slipping, a rack and pinion system is used, with a toothed rail placed between the two regular rails, which meshes with a drive gear under the locomotive.

Funicular 

Funiculars are also used to climb steep slopes, but instead of a rack use a rope, which is attached to two cars and a pulley. The two funicular cars travel up and down the slope on parallel sets of rails when the pulley is rotated. This design makes funiculars an efficient means of moving people and cargo up and down slopes. The earliest funicular railroad, the Reisszug, opened around 1500.

Freight trains 

Freight trains are dedicated to the transport of cargo (also known as goods), rather than people, and are made up of freight cars or wagons. Longer freight trains typically operate between classification yards, while local trains provide freight service between yards and individual loading and unloading points along railroad lines. Major origin or destination points for freight may instead be served by unit trains, which exclusively carry one type of cargo and move directly from the origin to the destination and back without any intermediate stops.

Under the right circumstances, transporting freight by train is less expensive than other modes of transport, and also more energy efficient than transporting freight by road. The Environmental and Energy Study Institute estimates that train transportation of freight is between 1.9 and 5.5 times more efficient than by truck, and also generates significantly less pollution. Rail freight is most economic when goods are being carried in bulk and over large distances, but it is less suited to short distances and small loads. With the advent of containerization, freight rail has become part of an intermodal freight network linked with trucking and container ships.

The main disadvantage of rail freight is its lack of flexibility and for this reason, rail has lost much of the freight business to road competition. Many governments are trying to encourage more freight back on to trains because of the community benefits that it would bring.

Cultural impact 

From the dawn of railroading, trains have had a significant cultural impact worldwide. Fast train travel made possible in days or hours journeys which previously took months. Transport of both freight and passengers became far cheaper, allowing for networked economies over large areas. Towns and cities along railroad lines grew in importance, while those bypassed declined or even became ghost towns. Major cities such as Chicago became prominent because they were places where multiple train lines met. In the United States, the completion of the first transcontinental railroad played a major role in the settling of the western part of the nation by non-indigenous migrants and its incorporation into the rest of the country. The Russian Trans-Siberian Railway had a similar impact by connecting the vast country from east to west, and making travel across the frozen Siberia possible.

Trains have long had a major influence on music, art, and literature. Many films heavily involve or are set on trains. Toy train sets are commonly used by children, traditionally boys. Railfans are found around the world, along with hobbyists who create model train layouts. Train enthusiasts generally have a positive relationship with the railroad industry, though sometimes cause issues by trespassing.

See also 

 List of railway companies
 Lists of named passenger trains
 Lists of rail accidents
 Overview of train systems by country

References

Bibliography

External links